= Tarik El Idrissi =

Moroccan film director

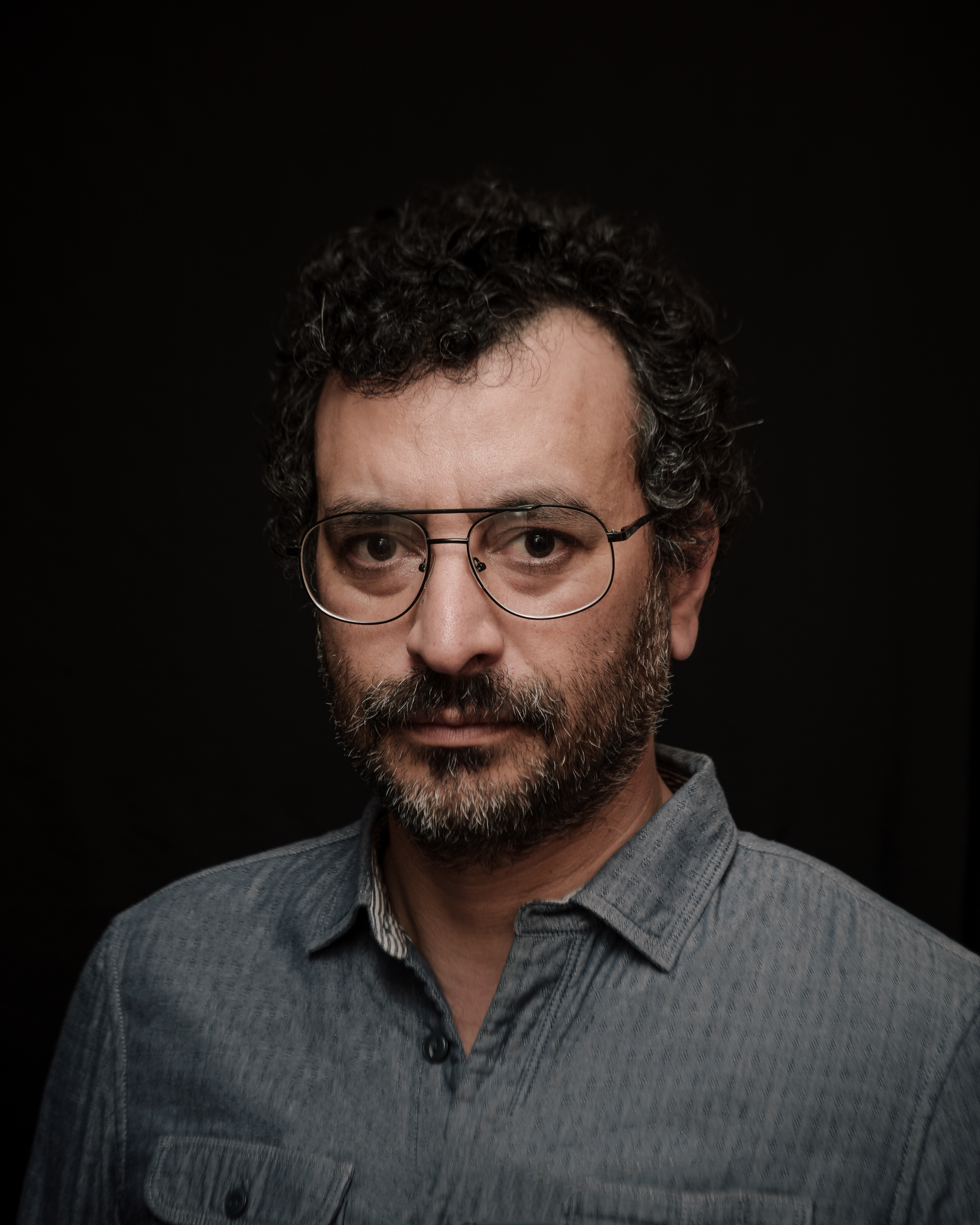
- El Idrissi in 2023
- Born: March 21, 1978 (age 48)

Tarik El Idrissi (Arabic: طارق الادريسي; born March 21, 1978) is a Moroccan director, screenwriter and producer

== Early life and education ==
At the age of 20 in 1999, El Idrissi embarked on a fishing boat bound for the Canary Islands, taking on the role of a deckhand. Motivated by a strong desire to explore the world and find his true self, this decision marked the beginning of his journey. Once settled in Madrid, he pursued his passion for film and discovered his calling while acting in a short film during his time at school.

== Career ==
Since then, Tarik el Idrissi has excelled as a filmmaker, having produced, directed, and written three documentaries and a feature film, all addressing fundamental issues such as historical memory, migration, and Berber identity. His unique approach is reflected not only in the content of his works but also in the form, blending and exploring different audiovisual styles.

Additionally, he has created two series and a telefilm for Moroccan television, solidifying his position as an influential filmmaker in the audiovisual scene.
